Randaberg Idrettslag is a Norwegian sports club from Randaberg. It has sections for football, swimming, gymnastics and volleyball.

Football
Before the 2007 season the football team made the national news as it increased its budget significantly in order to gain promotion, signing players like Petar Rnkovic and Sindre Erstad while Kjell-Inge Bråtveit was hired as manager. Øyvind Svenning, Jørgen Tengesdal  and Bjarte Lunde Aarsheim joined Randaberg from first-tier clubs during the summer. The club also tried to lure former player Erik Fuglestad out of retirement, but without success.

Other former Randaberg players include Iven Austbø, Alexander Gabrielsen and Ronny Espedal.

Recent history 
{|class="wikitable"
|-bgcolor="#efefef"
! Season
!
! Pos.
! Pl.
! W
! D
! L
! GS
! GA
! P
!Cup
!Notes
|-
|2001
|3. divisjon
|align=right |4
|align=right|22||align=right|12||align=right|3||align=right|7
|align=right|47||align=right|40||align=right|39
|
|
|-
|2002
|3. divisjon
|align=right |10
|align=right|22||align=right|6||align=right|5||align=right|11
|align=right|35||align=right|46||align=right|23
|
|
|-
|2003
|3. divisjon
|align=right |4
|align=right|22||align=right|11||align=right|6||align=right|5
|align=right|46||align=right|26||align=right|39
|First round
|
|-
|2004
|3. divisjon
|align=right |2
|align=right|22||align=right|13||align=right|4||align=right|5
|align=right|48||align=right|25||align=right|43
|First qualifying round
|
|-
|2005
|3. divisjon
|align=right |1
|align=right|22||align=right|17||align=right|2||align=right|3
|align=right|75||align=right|25||align=right|53
|First round
|Lost playoffs for promotion
|-
|2006
|3. divisjon
|align=right |2
|align=right|22||align=right|15||align=right|3||align=right|4
|align=right|50||align=right|19||align=right|48
|First round
|
|-
|2007
|3. divisjon
|align=right bgcolor=#DDFFDD| 1
|align=right|26||align=right|24||align=right|2||align=right|0
|align=right|83||align=right|9||align=right|74
|Second round
|Promoted to the 2. divisjon
|-
|2008
|2. divisjon
|align=right |2
|align=right|26||align=right|17||align=right|5||align=right|4
|align=right|68||align=right|29||align=right|56
|First round
|
|-
|2009
|2. divisjon
|align=right |5
|align=right|26||align=right|14||align=right|4||align=right|8
|align=right|60||align=right|39||align=right|46
|Second round
|
|-
|2010
|2. divisjon
|align=right bgcolor=#DDFFDD| 1
|align=right|26||align=right|17||align=right|2||align=right|7
|align=right|51||align=right|40||align=right|53
|Second round
|Promoted to the 1. divisjon
|-
|2011
|1. divisjon
|align=right bgcolor="#FFCCCC"| 15
|align=right|30||align=right|4||align=right|5||align=right|21
|align=right|37||align=right|85||align=right|17
|Third round
|Relegated to the 2. divisjon
|-
|2012 
|2. divisjon
|align=right bgcolor="#FFCCCC"| 14
|align=right|26||align=right|6||align=right|3||align=right|17
|align=right|31||align=right|49||align=right|21
|First round
|Relegated to the 3. divisjon
|-
|2013 
|3. divisjon
|align=right |8
|align=right|26||align=right|10||align=right|5||align=right|11
|align=right|49||align=right|45||align=right|35
|First qualifying round
|
|}

References

External links
 Official site
 Official site, football section

 
Football clubs in Norway
Norwegian volleyball clubs
Association football clubs established in 1925
Sport in Randaberg